Félix del Blanco Prieto (15 June 1937 – 10 April 2021) was a Spanish prelate of the Catholic Church who spent his career in the diplomatic service of the Holy See, including stints heading the missions in countries such as Angola and Malta among other countries. He was then appointed Almoner of the office of Papal Charities in 2007 and retired from the same position in 2012.

Biography
Félix del Blanco Prieto was born in Mogrovejo, Castilla y León, Spain, on 15 June 1937. He was ordained a priest on 27 May 1961.

He served as secretary to Secretary of State Cardinal Agostino Casaroli.

On 31 May 1991, Pope John Paul II named him a titular archbishop, Apostolic Pro-Nuncio to São Tomé and Príncipe, and Apostolic Delegate to Angola. He received his episcopal consecration from Cardinal Agostino Casaroli on 6 July 1991.

On 5 May 1996, Pope John Paul appointed him Apostolic Nuncio to Cameroon, adding the title Apostolic Nuncio to Equatorial Guinea on 28 June.

On 5 June 2003, Pope John Paul named him Apostolic Nuncio to Malta and added the title Apostolic Nuncio to Libya on 24 June.

On 28 July 2007, Pope Benedict XVI named him Papal Almoner.

Pope Benedict accepted his resignation on 3 November 2012.

He died on 10 April 2021 at the age of 83.

See also 

Apostolic Nunciature
Apostolic Nuncio
List of diplomatic missions of the Holy See

References

External links
Catholic Hierarchy: Archbishop Félix del Blanco Prieto 

1937 births
2021 deaths
Diplomats of the Holy See
Apostolic Nuncios to São Tomé and Príncipe
Apostolic Nuncios to Angola
Apostolic Nuncios to Cameroon
Apostolic Nuncios to Equatorial Guinea
Apostolic Nuncios to Malta
Apostolic Nuncios to Libya
People from Cantabria